The , or DFS  , was formed in 1933 to centralise all gliding activity in Germany, under the directorship of Professor Walter Georgii. It was formed by the nationalisation of the Rhön-Rossitten Gesellschaft (RRG) at Darmstadt.

The DFS was involved in producing training sailplanes for the Hitler Youth and Luftwaffe, as well as conducting research into advanced technologies such as flying wings and rocket propulsion. Notable DFS-produced aircraft include the DFS 230 transport glider (1600+ produced), the German counterpart to the British Airspeed Horsa glider, and the DFS 194, similar to the famous Messerschmitt Me 163 rocket fighter.

In 1938, following a fatal accident at the Wasserkuppe, DFS held a competition to design a more effective speed brake for gliders.  The final design, produced by Wolfgang and Ulrich Hütter of Schempp-Hirth, is used to this day and generally referred to as "Schempp-Hirth airbrakes".

List of some major DFS aircraft projects 

DFS Model 6Target glider (prototypes only), 1936
DFS Model 12  see Argus As 292 1937
DFS 39  Lippisch-designed tail-less research aircraft
DFS 40  Lippisch-designed tail-less research aircraft
DFS 193  experimental aircraft
DFS 194  rocket-powered research aircraft, forerunner of Me 163
DFS 228  HIGH-ALTITUDE rocket-powered reconnaissance aircraft (prototype only)
DFS 230  transport glider (1600 produced)
DFS 331  transport glider (prototype)
DFS 332
DFS 346  supersonic research aircraft
Stamer-Lippisch Zögling 1  basic trainer
DFS Hangwind  (Ridge Lift), basic trainer (twin boom)
DFS E 32  sailplane
Einheitsschulflugzeug  (Standard Flight Trainer), glider, basic flight trainer (foldable tail)
DFS Fliege IIa  (Fly), sailplane
DFS Jacht 71  Amphibious sailplane
DFS Rhönadler  (Eagle of the Rhön), high-performance sailplane
DFS Zögling 33  basic training glider
DFS Hol's der Teufel  (To Hell With It!), training glider
DFS Rhönbussard  sailplane
DFS Präsident  (President), high-performance sailplane
DFS Zögling 35  updated version of the Zögling basic trainer
DFS Habicht  aerobatic sail-plane
DFS Kranich  (Crane), two-seat sailplane
Schulgleiter 38  basic training glider
DFS Seeadler  (sea eagle), flying boat sailplane
DFS Rammer  aerial ramming plane project powered by a solid rocket engine
DFS Eber  parasite fighter project

Legacy of the DFS
The modern DLR still does research into gliding flight, as the DFS once did. An example of this is their enlarged 17-meter wingspan Glaser-Dirks DG-300 Elan high-performance glider, used to precisely set and measure comparative glider performance parameters.

See also
Hanna Reitsch
Hans Jacobs
List of Gliders
List of aircraft of the WW2 Luftwaffe
List of RLM aircraft designations
Glider manufacturers

References

Aerospace research institutes
Defunct aircraft manufacturers of Germany
Gliding in Germany
Research and development in Nazi Germany
Research institutes in Germany